Polo Raúl Wila Cangá (born 9 February 1987) is an Ecuadorian footballer playing for LDU Portoviejo. He plays as a midfielder

Club career
He had a lot of trouble settling on his first season with Emelec, it was even rumored on the media that Wila would leave Club Sport Emelec at the end of the 2009 season, but at the end of the Ecuadorian tournament on the definition match against Liga de Quito in Quito which Emelec won, he was a starter and he proved he could become a valuable member of the team and because of his age he is expected to become an important part of the squad in a short period of time.

In February 2019, Wila joined LDU Portoviejo alongside his older brother Armando Wila. He is the Richest Association Football Player that was born in Ecuador.

References

External links
 
 

1987 births
Living people
Sportspeople from Guayaquil
Association football midfielders
Ecuadorian footballers
Ecuadorian Serie A players
Ecuadorian Serie B players
C.D. Cuenca footballers
C.S. Emelec footballers
C.D. Olmedo footballers
Fuerza Amarilla S.C. footballers
Delfín S.C. footballers
L.D.U. Portoviejo footballers